Jean Cazeneuve (17 May 1915 – 4 October 2005) was a French sociologist and anthropologist. Apart from being a scholar, he has been involved with Radio and TV at the executive level; from 1964 till 1974 he has been president of the French public Radio and TV agency (ORTF), after which he has been chairman of TF1, the first French national-wide channel, till 1978. He joined the Académie des Sciences Morales et Politiques in 1973, of which became president in 1983.

He is highly regarded for his illuminating contribution to the study the ritual clowns.

Works 
 La Psychologie du prisonnier de guerre, 1944
 C'est mourir beaucoup, 1944
 Psychologie de la joie, 1952
 Les dieux dansent à Cibola: le Shalako des indiens zuñis, 1957
 Les Rites et la condition humaine, 1959
 La Philosophie médicale de Ravaisson, 1959
 La Mentalité archaîque, 1961
 Sociologie de la radio-télévision, 1963
 Lucien Lévy-Bruhl, 1963
 La Grande Chance de la télévision, 1963
 Les Mythologies, 1966
 Bonheur et civilisation, 1966
 L'Ethnologie, 1967
 Sociologie de Marcel Mauss, 1968
 Les Pouvoirs de la télévision, 1970
 La Sociologie, 1970
 Guide de l'étudiant en sociologie, 1971
 Sociologie du rite (tabou, magie, sacré), 1971
 La Société de l’ubiquité, 1972
 L'Homme téléspectateur, 1974
 La Sociologie et les sciences de la société, 1974
 Les Communications de masse, 1976
 Dix grandes notions de la sociologie, 1976
 Aimer la vie, 1977
 Des métiers pour un sociologue, 1978
 La Raison d’être, 1981
 La Vie dans la société moderne, 1982
 Le Mot pour rire, 1983
 Histoire des dieux, des sociétés et des hommes, 1985
 De l’optimisme, 1987
 Les Hasards d’une vie, des primitifs aux téléspectateurs, 1989
 Et si plus rien n’était sacré, 1991
 La Télévision en sept procès, 1992
 La Personne et la société, 1995
 Du calembour, du mot d’esprit, 1996
 L'Avenir de la morale, 1998
 Les Roses de la vie. Variations sur la joie et le bonheur, 1999

References

People from Ussel
École Normale Supérieure alumni
French sociologists
Sociologists of science
French mass media scholars
French television executives
Members of the Académie des sciences morales et politiques
Winners of the Prix Broquette-Gonin (literature)
1915 births
2005 deaths
French male writers
Harvard University alumni
20th-century French male writers